is a Japanese footballer who plays as a forward for Shonan Bellmare.

Career statistics

References

External links

2002 births
Living people
Sportspeople from Gunma Prefecture
Association football people from Gunma Prefecture
Japanese footballers
Japan youth international footballers
Association football forwards
J1 League players
Swiss Super League players
Swiss Promotion League players
Shonan Bellmare players
FC Sion players
Japanese expatriate footballers
Expatriate footballers in Switzerland
Japanese expatriate sportspeople in Switzerland